Such Is Life is a 1936 British comedy film directed by Randall Faye and starring Gene Gerrard, Claude Dampier and Jean Colin. It was made at Shepperton Studios.

Main cast
 Gene Gerrard as Jack Rayner  
 Claude Dampier as Green  
 Jean Colin as Betty Blair  
 Eve Gray as Vicky  
 Frank Birch as Mockett  
 MacArthur Gordon as Chapman  
 Aubrey Mallalieu as Sallust  
 Paul Sheridan as Mandeville  
 Billie Carlisle as Secretary

References

Bibliography
 Low, Rachael. Filmmaking in 1930s Britain. George Allen & Unwin, 1985.
 Wood, Linda. British Films, 1927-1939. British Film Institute, 1986.

External links

1936 films
British comedy films
1936 comedy films
Films shot at Shepperton Studios
Films directed by Randall Faye
British black-and-white films
Films scored by Eric Spear
1930s English-language films
1930s British films